Luis Fernando Mosquera Alomia (born August 17, 1986) is a Colombian footballer.

Club career 
Mosquera began his career with Deportes Quindío in the Colombian Categoria Primera B in 2005. On 17 November 2007, he scored two goals against Independiente Medellin in a comeback 3-4 victory at Atanasio Girardot, which left Medellin out of the top 8 seeds for the playoffs. He had a great 2007-II season, scoring eight goals and forming a partnership with Edison Toloza, who scored nine goals.

In 2008, he joined Independiente Santa Fe. He scored eight goals in the 2008-II tournament and had a good performance, but in the 2009-I tournament, new manager Hernán Darío Gómez didn't give him much playing time, so he only scored four goals, also because of various injuries he suffered. In June 2009, he was loaned out to Independiente Medellin, where he scored many important goals, such as the two goals he scored against Junior in the playoffs on December 9, to help Medellin qualify for the finals. In the finals against Huila, he scored a goal in the second leg, which eventually helped the club win the 2009-II tournament.

In January 2010, he joined Jaguares de Chiapas along with his Medellin teammate, Jackson Martínez. After playing only six games and scoring no goals, he returned to Independiente Medellin and stayed there until December 2011. In January 2012 he joined Atletico Nacional, where he won three titles: the 2012 Copa Colombia, the Superliga Colombiana, and the 2013-I tournament, scoring a goal in the second leg of the finals against Santa Fe. In July 2013, he joined Deportivo Cali. Cali made the final of the 2013-II tournament that year, but lost to Mosquera's former club, Atletico Nacional.

International career 
Mosquera debuted for Colombia on April 30, 2008 in a friendly match against Venezuela as a substitute in the 80th minute. He scored his first international goal only a few minutes after coming into the game, scoring the fifth goal for Colombia which they won 5-2.

Honours

References

External links

1986 births
Living people
Colombian footballers
Association football forwards
Deportes Quindío footballers
Independiente Santa Fe footballers
Independiente Medellín footballers
Chiapas F.C. footballers
Atlético Nacional footballers
Deportivo Cali footballers
Colombian expatriate footballers
Expatriate footballers in Mexico
Colombia international footballers
Boca Juniors de Cali footballers
Universitario Popayán footballers
Alianza Petrolera F.C. players
People from Buenaventura, Valle del Cauca
Sportspeople from Valle del Cauca Department
21st-century Colombian people